The 2020 Women's Africa Cup of Nations, officially known as the Total Women's Africa Cup Of Nations for sponsorship purposes, was supposed to be the 14th edition of the biennial African international women's association football tournament organized by CAF. This would have been the first edition to have 12 teams compete in the main phase of the tournament as opposed to 8 from previous seasons.

CAF decided to cancel this edition of the tournament on 30 June 2020 at an executive virtual meeting, citing "challenging conditions" caused by the COVID-19 pandemic in Africa and rather approve the creation of the CAF Women's Champions League which began in November 2021. Subsequently, the men's edition scheduled to take place the following year was moved to January 2022, while the 2020 African Nations Championship was postponed to April 2021.

The tournament was earlier scheduled to take place between 23 November to 20 December 2020, and would originally be expanded from 8 to 12 teams. Nigeria were the defending champions.

Host selection
The Republic of the Congo were named as the hosts in September 2018, but withdrew in July the following year.

No official replacement hosts were named by the CAF before its cancellation, although sources mentioned Tunisia, Nigeria and Equatorial Guinea as possible hosts with no official confirmation given.

Qualification

Thirty-six out of the 54 CAF nations entered their women's national teams into the qualification rounds which were scheduled to be played in April and June 2020 before being initially postponed due to the COVID-19 pandemic in Africa and eventually cancelled.

References

2020 Africa Women Cup of Nations
Women's Africa Cup of Nations tournaments
2020 in African football
2020 in women's association football
Association football events cancelled due to the COVID-19 pandemic